KZZN (1490 AM, "High Plains Radio") is a radio station broadcasting a classic country music format. Licensed to Littlefield, Texas, United States, the station is currently owned by Monte Spearman, through licensee HPRN, and features programming from Citadel Media.

References

External links

Country radio stations in the United States
ZZN
Lamb County, Texas